Towarzystwo Piłkarskie Ostrovia 1909 Ostrów Wielkopolski, commonly known as TP Ostrovia Ostrów Wielkopolski, is a Polish football club based in Ostrów Wielkopolski, one of the oldest still existing football club in the Greater Poland region.

References

External links
 Official Website

Association football clubs established in 1909
Ostrovia
Football clubs in Greater Poland Voivodeship
1909 establishments in Poland